Nicholas Andrew Schultz (born August 25, 1982) is a Canadian former professional ice hockey defenceman who played 17 seasons in the National Hockey League (NHL) for the Minnesota Wild, Edmonton Oilers, Columbus Blue Jackets, and Philadelphia Flyers. The Minnesota Wild drafted him in the second round of the 2000 NHL Entry Draft. He played junior hockey for the Prince Albert Raiders of the Western Hockey League (WHL).  He represented Canada in international competition at the junior and senior level.

Playing career

Minor
As a child, Schultz played minor hockey in his hometown of Strasbourg for the Maroons.  He was selected by the Prince Albert Raiders in the third round (43rd overall) of the 1997 Western Hockey League (WHL) Bantam Draft. Before joining the Raiders, Schultz played for Yorkton Mallers in the SMAAAHL.  During his only season in the SMAAAHL, Schultz was named Rookie of the Year for the Mallers club, as well as being named the Top Defenceman and Most Valuable Player of the league's All-Star Game.

Junior
Schultz made his debut for the Raiders in the 1998–99 WHL season, playing in 58 games, scoring 5 goals and adding 18 assists. In his sophomore season in the WHL, he played in 72 games, scoring 11 goals and adding 33 assists. After the 1999-2000 season, Schultz was named the Raiders top defenceman and most improved player. The Minnesota Wild selected Schultz in the second round (33rd overall) of the 2000 NHL Entry Draft. Schultz served as team captain for the 2000–01 season, playing 59 games, scoring 17 goals and adding 30 assists.

Professional
After the Raiders 2000–01 WHL season was complete, Schultz made his professional debut with the Cleveland Lumberjacks of the International Hockey League, suiting up for four games, where he scored a goal and added an assist. The next season, Schultz made his National Hockey League debut, after making the Wild out of training camp. He made his NHL debut against the Edmonton Oilers.  During his rookie season, Schultz played in 52 games, scoring 4 goals and adding 6 assists. After the Wild's season was complete, Schultz joined the Houston Aeros of the American Hockey League for the playoffs. On February 27, 2012, Schultz was traded to the Edmonton Oilers. Schultz is currently 2nd in all-time games played for the Minnesota Wild with 743 games played.

On March 5, 2014, Schultz was traded to the Columbus Blue Jackets in exchange for a 5th round pick.

Schultz's tenure with the Blue Jackets was kept brief when on July 2, 2014, Schultz joined his fourth NHL club, signing a one-year deal as a free agent with the Philadelphia Flyers. On February 18, 2015, the Flyers re-signed Schultz to a two-year deal worth $2.25 million annually.

International play
Schultz represented Saskatchewan at the 1999 Canada Winter Games.

Personal life
Schultz grew up on his family's farm in Strasbourg, Saskatchewan.  He has two older brothers, one of whom, Kris, played professional hockey in the CHL and UHL. One of his brothers is named Terrence and his parents' names are Robert and Carol.  His cousin Jesse Schultz made his NHL debut in the 2006-07 season, playing for the Vancouver Canucks. Schultz is married to Jessica (née Dibb). They have a son (Jake Schultz aka Mr Shortstack) and two daughters. They make their home in Calgary. Jessica's sister is also married to NHL player Cory Sarich, last of the Colorado Avalanche.  Schultz is friends with Jarret Stoll and is often present at Stoll's yearly charity golf tournament. 

On June 26th, 2019, Schultz was hired by the Philadelphia Flyers as a player development coach.

Awards
Played in the NHL YoungStars Game - 2002–03

Career statistics

Regular season and playoffs

International

References

External links

 

1982 births
Living people
Canadian ice hockey defencemen
Cleveland Lumberjacks players
Columbus Blue Jackets players
Edmonton Oilers players
Houston Aeros (1994–2013) players
Ice hockey people from Saskatchewan
Kassel Huskies players
Minnesota Wild draft picks
Minnesota Wild players
People from Rural Municipality McKillop No. 220, Saskatchewan
Philadelphia Flyers players
Prince Albert Raiders players
Canadian expatriate ice hockey players in the United States